Hardev Mahinangal is a Punjabi singer of Punjab, India. He started his music career in 1995.

Early life 

Mahinangal was born as Hardev Singh to father S. Gurbakhsh Singh and mother Dalip Kaur, in the village of Mahinangal near Talwandi Sabo in Bathinda district of Indian Punjab. He got his primary as well as higher education from Talwandi Sabo. He used to sing songs in schools and later in college festivals. His first won award is still at his village. He is married to Sarabjit Kaur and has two daughters and one son who all are settled in New Zealand. He is a great, fun and humorous person and is a great singer:)

Career 

He learned music from Raagi Milap Singh and his first album was Jhuthiye Jahaan Diye. Later he released Ashiq Nu Fansi from which a song, "main kurhi ghariban di, mainu pyar na mundia kar ve" was a hit. Waddhi Bhabi Maa Wargi and Dil Di Gall were the further albums. Then the albums, Ribbon Gia Na Kattia and Mahi Chahunda Kise Hor Nu (1998), made him a star. For Mahi Chahunda Kise Hor Nu he received a Suzuki Esteem car as an honor. In 1999 he visited France. His next religious album Chall Challiye Gurudware was also a hit.

Discography 

Jhuthiye Jahaan Diye
Ashiq Nu Fansi
Waddhi Bhabi Maa Wargi
Dil Di Gall
Ribbon Gia Na Kattia
Mahi Chahunda Kise Hor Nu
Vichhre Na Mar Jaaiye
Sohnia Jattian
Joban
Jinne Tukrhe Hone Dil De
Ghuggian Da Jorha
Pyar Tera
Naseebo
Hoka
Love and Breakup

Religious

Chall Challiye Gurudware

References 

Punjabi-language singers
Living people
Year of birth missing (living people)